Leaupepe Taulapapa Faimaala Fuatino Vaovasamanaia Filipo (1932 – 2014) was a Samoan politician. She was the first female member of the Legislative Assembly, the first woman to be elected Deputy Speaker, and the first female judge in the Lands and Title Court.

Biography
Born in 1932, Filipo attended school in Leififi, Samoa College and St Mary's College. She attended university in New Zealand, where she qualified as a nurse. She remained in New Zealand, working in Dunedin, Wellington, Auckland and Gisborne, before returning to Samoa to work at the hospital in Motootua. She held two noble titles; Leaupepe from her father's family, and Taulapapa from her mother's family.

In 1970 general elections Filipo contested the Palauli West constituency, and was elected unopposed, becoming the first female member of the Legislative Assembly. She switched to the A'ana Alofi No. 1 constituency for the 1973 elections and was re-elected, with her husband Vaovasamanaia Filipo winning her former seat in Palauli West. She was defeated in the 1976 elections, losing to Le'aupepetele Taoipu. During her time in the Legislative Assembly, she became the first woman to be elected Deputy Speaker.

In addition to her role in parliament, Filipo became the first female judge in the Land and Title Court.

After retiring, she moved to New Zealand, where she died in 2014. She was buried in Tulaele in Samoa.

References

1932 births
Samoan nurses
Samoan expatriates in New Zealand
Samoan women in politics
Members of the Legislative Assembly of Samoa
Land and Titles Court of Samoa judges
Samoan women judges
2014 deaths